Tubercle of the femur can refer to:
 Quadrate tubercle
 Adductor tubercle of femur